Steve Hardin (born December 30, 1971) was a linebacker in the Canadian Football League, playing 5 seasons with the BC Lions.

A graduate of University of Oregon, Hardin played in the WLAF with the Rhein Fire in 1996, and used this as a springboard to get a chance with the NFL's Indianapolis Colts (he played one game for them in 1996.) He signed with the Leos in 1998 and won the Grey Cup with them in 2000 and was an all-star in 2002. Hardin's 2003 season and career was cut short as a pre-season injury forced him to miss the entire season. Regardless, he put his time and energy to good use and won the prestigious Tom Pate Memorial Award for community service in 2003. He played 78 games for the Lions.

References

1971 births
Living people
BC Lions players
Indianapolis Colts players
Oregon Ducks football players
Sportspeople from Bellevue, Washington
Rhein Fire players